Turks Head is a precipitous black headland over 200 m high, 5 nautical miles (9 km) east-southeast of Cape Evans on the west side of Ross Island in Antractica. Discovered by the Discovery expedition (1901–04) and so named because of its resemblance to a head swathed in a turban.

See also
 Turks Head Bay
 Turks Head Ridge

Headlands of Ross Island